TNT is an Australian TV station based in Hobart, Tasmania, owned by Southern Cross Austereo. Originally broadcasting to northern Tasmania, it has broadcast to the whole of Tasmania since aggregation of the Tasmanian television market in 1994.

History
 1962 – Founded as Northern TV Ltd and broadcasts in Launceston and Northern Tasmania
 1965 – Became part of ENT Ltd (Examiner-Northern TV Ltd)
 1980 – adopts a custom version of the Nine Network's "9 Dots" logo 
 1982 – ENT bought TVT-6 in Hobart 
 1985 – TNT and TVT officially relaunched as TasTV, callsigns remain for both stations
 1989 – ENT sold TNT-9 to Tricom Corporation, which subsequently became Southern Cross Broadcasting; station became known on-air as Southern Cross Network
 1994 – Aggregation of Tasmanian television market occurs – Southern Cross broadcasts statewide, competing with TasTV
 1999 – Southern Cross Tasmania, while still a part of Southern Cross Broadcasting, changes logo independently of Southern Cross stations on the mainland.
 2003 – Southern Cross and WIN Television launch Tasmanian Digital Television, a jointly owned digital-only commercial station based in Hobart relaying Network Ten content. 
 2005 – Southern Cross Broadcasting adapts new logo for all stations it owns. Southern Cross Tasmania loses its Tasmanian Tiger logo to a unified corporate Southern Cross logo.
 2018 – Southern Cross Tasmania became Seven Tasmania as local branding is replaced by network branding.

Local programming
TNT produces the market's number one news bulletin daily plus local lifestyle and sports programming.

Previous local programmes produced by TNT-9 include Sports Club (weekly sports review), Quiz Quest (children's game show), The Saturday Night Show (variety), Down the Line (morning talk/local events), The Saturday Morning Fun Show (kids), Tasmanian New Faces (talent) and annual coverage of Targa Tasmania and The Launceston Cup.

News
The station produces its flagship news program, Nightly News (formerly Southern Cross News), broadcast live every night at 6:00pm and presented from the Launceston studios. Short news updates are also produced and broadcast throughout the day alongside the national Seven News Updates. The bulletin is consistently the highest rating television program in Tasmania. A shortened version of the day's bulletin is upload by the station's YouTube channel, featuring only local news and sport reports alongside weather forecasts.

The station originally planned to retitle the bulletin Seven News Tasmania on 1 July 2018 to coincide with the station's rebrand as Seven Tasmania. But the relaunch was delayed without any notice given. When asked by ABC's Media Watch, the CEO of SCA Grant Blackley stated that the Seven Network did not want their name featured on any output they do not control, so SCA was coming up with a new brand. On 3 December 2018, the bulletin changed its title to Nightly News, a brand the station formerly used from the 1990s up to the early 2000s.

Outside of this bulletin, Seven Tasmania airs national news and current affairs output from the Seven Network, including:
Sunrise 
Weekend Sunrise
The Morning Show
Seven News (Early News, Morning News, Afternoon News at 4)

TNT simulcasts the weekday edition of Seven News at 4 from HSV-7 in Melbourne, along with Seven Morning News at 11.30 on weekdays and Seven News at 5 on weekends from ATN-7 in Sydney.

Current presenters
Main anchors
 Kim Millar (Weeknights & Fills)
 Louise Houbaer (Weekends & Fills)

Sport presenters
 Tom Johnson
 Makenna Baily (fills)

Weather presenters
 Peter Murphy (Weeknights & Fills) 
 Laura Moore
 Jackie Harvey
 Victoria Eastoe
 Chelsea Freestone
 Carmen Wilkin

Non-news output

Hook, Line and Sinker
The fishing show Hook, Line and Sinker is the most popular Tasmanian-made program airing and is broadcast Australia-wide. The program is hosted by former news journalists Andrew Hart and Nick Duigan.

Renovation Relief
Renovation Relief is a DIY Program hosted by famous wood-chopper David Foster in which he and a team of people from sponsors (i.e. Gunns) renovate a house, most commonly for people who have done something for the community or have enabled children.

Targa Torque
Broadcast every night during Targa Tasmania fortnight, Andrew Hart and Nick Duigan report and review the events of the day.

Holiday at Home
Holiday at Home is a lifestyle program which promotes places to stay and things to do in Tasmania.

Burnie Ten – Ten Week Challenge
For the ten weeks leading up to the Burnie Ten, Mark Connelly trains a group of people in a program sponsored by Seven Tasmania. Weekly updates are broadcast during commercial breaks. In the early years of the program, people who took part were well known in Tasmania, however in 2006, a Launceston family were trained to run the event.

Sports coverage
Seven Tasmania airs sports coverage from Seven Network, which includes Australian Rules Football, tennis and motorsport. In the 1990s, the station aired Network Ten's daily sports program Sports Tonight as part of its dual-affiliation, however this was eventually replaced by Seven's current affairs program, Today Tonight.

The station airs three AFL games per round courtesy of its affiliation with Seven. Matches held in Tasmania are broadcast on delay. The station promotes extensive coverage of Tasmanian sports in its news coverage including cricket, athletics, netball and basketball. The station's previous sports reporters were Chris Rowbottom, Alicia Muling, and Trent Dann.

Local sport
Locally, coverage of the international road race Targa Tasmania is produced and aired each year. The station also produces live coverage of the Launceston and Hobart Cup. Regular updates on the annual Boxing Day Sydney to Hobart Yacht Race are broadcast during the duration of the race.

Affiliation
The station is affiliated with the metropolitan Seven Network and also broadcasts most of Seven's sub-channels (7TWO, 7mate, SBN, and Racing.com). Rival Tasmanian station TVT-6 (WIN Television) is affiliated with the metropolitan Nine Network.

Following aggregation in 1994, the station was a combined Seven and Ten affiliate, however the Ten content was gradually removed from the schedule in the late 2000s following the launch of digital-only station TDT in 2003. TDT is a joint-venture between Southern Cross Austereo and WIN.

Main transmitters

Notes:
1. HAAT estimated from http://www.itu.int/SRTM3/ using EHAAT.

See also
 Seven (Southern Cross Austereo)

References

External links
  of 7 Tasmania's Nightly News
 TNT9 at Television.AU

Television channels and stations established in 1962
Southern Cross Media Group